Anna Lindhagen (7 April 1870 in Stockholm – 15 May 1941 in Stockholm) was a Swedish politician (Social Democrat), social reformer and women's rights activist. In collaboration with Anna Åbergsson, she was a leading force in the introduction of allotment in Sweden. She was one of the driving forces behind the foundation of the National Association for Women's Suffrage. Lindhagen was a member of the Stockholm City Council in 1911–1923.

Life
Anna Lindhagen was the daughter of Albert Lindhagen and the sister of Carl Lindhagen and Arthur Lindhagen. She was a licensed nurse and an activist within the Labour movement: from 1902 until 1925, she worked as a child care inspector for the Stockholm Poor care. In 1902, Lindhagen was one of the leading figures who called for the formation of a women's organisation for women suffrage, which was founded as the Swedish Society for Woman Suffrage. With her combined membership in the upper-classes and her social democratic and radically socialistic views, she functioned as a uniting force between right wing and left wing women within the suffrage union. From 1911 until 1916, she was the editor of Morgonbris, the paper on the social democratic women.

In 1906, Anna Lindberg and Anna Åbergsson founded the Föreningen koloniträdgårdar i Stockholm (The Society of the Stockholm Allotment), the first allotment society in Stockholm.

Legacy
At Fjällgatan in Stockholm, there is a museum called Borgarrummen (The Bourgeoisie Rooms) depicting a merchant class home from the mid-19th century, furnished by Anna Lindhagen and where she herself lived prior to her death. Close by, there is a small park, Anna Lindhagens täppa, named after her. At Fjällagatan not long from there, there is also a sculpture of Anna Lindhagen.

Sources 
Ur Stockholmsliv II, Staffan Tjerneld, 1950
CD:n Söder i våra hjärtan, Topsy Bondesson
Barbro Hedvall (2011). Susanna Eriksson Lundqvist. red. Vår rättmätiga plats. Om kvinnornas kamp för rösträtt.. Förlag Bonnier.

Further reading 
 

1870 births
1941 deaths
Swedish Social Democratic Party politicians
20th-century Swedish women politicians
20th-century Swedish politicians
Swedish suffragists
Local politicians in Sweden
19th-century Swedish women politicians
19th-century Swedish politicians